is a Tunguska event-sized asteroid, classified as a near-Earth object of the Aten group, approximately  in diameter. On 4 September 2022 with an observation arc of 8 days, it was listed with a 1-in-109 chance of impacting Earth with a Torino scale of 1 for a virtual impactor on 4 September 2068 00:52 UTC. The nominal approach is expected to occur 26 August 2068.

Closest approach to Earth in 2022 occurred on 29 August 2022 at a distance of about 1.8 million km.

References

External links 
 Archive of Sentry Risk Table entry for 2022 QX4 with a 8-day observation arc and a cumulative 0.69% of an Earth impact
 (Expired) risk corridor for 2022 QX4
 Found archival observations of 2022 QX4 from 2013 (MPML 3 September 2022)
 
 
 

Minor planet object articles (unnumbered)
Discoveries by ATLAS
Near-Earth objects removed from the Sentry Risk Table
20220824
20220829